USS Delphinus has been the name of two ships of the United States Navy, named after Delphinus, a northern constellation.

 , a transport launched in 1915 as San Mateo; purchased by the U.S. Navy in 1942 and renamed; decommissioned, 1946.
 , was renamed Pegasus, the lead ship of the Pegasus class of patrol hydrofoils; launched, 1974; sold, 1996.

United States Navy ship names